Johan (Jussi) Vatanen (15 January 1875, Eno – 1936, Kaluga) was a Finnish labourer and politician. He was a member of the Parliament of Finland from 1916 to 1918, representing the Social Democratic Party of Finland (SDP). During the Finnish Civil War he sided with the Reds and when the Finnish Socialist Workers' Republic collapsed, he fled to Soviet Russia. On 29 August 1918, he took part in the founding congress of the Communist Party of Finland (SKP) in Moscow. He worked as a party functionary, as a propagandist and as a teacher until 1935, when he retired. He died in 1936 in Kaluga.

References

1875 births
1936 deaths
People from Joensuu
People from Kuopio Province (Grand Duchy of Finland)
Social Democratic Party of Finland politicians
Communist Party of Finland politicians
Members of the Parliament of Finland (1916–17)
Members of the Parliament of Finland (1917–19)
People of the Finnish Civil War (Red side)
Finnish emigrants to the Soviet Union